Fulvenes are the class of hydrocarbon obtained by formally cross-conjugating one ring and methylidene through a common exocyclic double bond.

The name is derived from fulvene, which has one pentagonal ring. Other examples include methylenecyclopropene (triafulvene) and heptafulvene.

Subclasses
Several types of fulvenes are defined. They are:
pentafulvene
triafulvene
heptafulvene
nonafulvene

Preparation
Fulvenes are readily prepared by the condensation of  cyclopentadiene and aldehydes and ketones:
C5H6  +  R2C=O  →  C4H4C=CR2  +  H2O
Thiele is credited with discovering this reaction.

Modern synthesis of fulvenes employ buffer systems.

Ligand in organometallic chemistry
Fulvenes are common ligands and ligand precursors in organometallic chemistry.  2,3,4,5-Tetramethylfulvene, abbreviated Me4Fv, results from the deprotonation of cationic pentamethylcyclopentadienyl complexes. Some Me4Fv complexes are called tuck-in complexes.

References

Hydrocarbons
Cycloalkenes